Vochov is a municipality and village in Plzeň-North District in the Plzeň Region of the Czech Republic. It has about 1,400 inhabitants.

Notable people
Bohuslav Ebermann (born 1948), ice hockey player

References

Villages in Plzeň-North District